Markus Thormeyer (born August 25, 1997) is a Canadian competitive swimmer who specializes in freestyle and backstroke. Originally from Delta, Thormeyer moved in 2015 to Vancouver, British Columbia after graduating high school to train with the High Performance Centre-Vancouver. While he swims he is also pursuing an undergraduate degree in environmental science at the University of British Columbia.

Career
Thormeyer began swimming at the age of 10 for the Markham Aquatic Club in Markham, Ontario but moved across the country to Delta, British Columbia shortly after he started. He continued to swim competitively under the Winskill Dolphins Swim Club through to his high school graduation.

2013–2016
As an age-group swimmer, Thormeyer made a name for himself on the Canadian swimming scene. At 15 he competed at the 2013 Canada Summer Games for Team British Columbia, where he earned a bronze in the men's 100m backstroke. He also represented Canada multiple times on the junior international stage, being the youngest male on Canada's team at the 2013 World Junior Swimming Championships and winning five bronze medals at the 2014 Junior Pan Pacific Swimming Championships. These accomplishments earned him the Delta Sport's Hall of Fame 2014 Youth Athlete of the Year and the Sport BC Junior Male Athlete of the Year in 2016.

It was not until 2015 when Thormeyer made his first senior international appearance at the 2015 Pan American Games where he won a silver as a part of the 4x100 m freestyle relay. Later that summer at the 2015 FINA World Junior Swimming Championships, Thormeyer went along to win gold while also setting a new world junior record with Penny Oleksiak, Taylor Ruck, and Javier Acevedo on Canada's mixed 4 × 100 m freestyle relay.

After winning a gold and two bronzes at the Canadian Olympic Trials in 2016, he was named to Canada's Olympic team for the 2016 Summer Olympics. Thormeyer swam the third leg of the men's 4 × 100 m freestyle relay which qualified for the final in fifth place, but ultimately placed seventh overall in the final. Later that year in December, Thormeyer won a bronze medal as part of Canada's 4x50m mixed freestyle event alongside Sandrine Mainville, Michelle Toro, and Yuri Kisil at the World Short Course Championships in Windsor, Ontario.

2017–2021
Thormeyer was also a part of the University of British Columbia varsity swim team. Winning multiple individual events and contributing as a key swimmer for the relays earned him the title of both U Sports Rookie of the Year and UBC Thunderbirds Rookie of the Year in his first year on the collegiate stage. As part of the Thunderbirds, he contributing to multiple Canada West Championship titles and U Sport Championship national titles.

In April 2017, Thormeyer was named to Canada's 2017 World Aquatics Championships team in Budapest, Hungary, where he contributed to a bronze medal for Canada in the 4 × 100 m mixed freestyle relay. He also was named to the Canada's 2017 Summer Universiade team and competed at the games that summer in TaiPei City, Taiwan.

In September 2017, Thormeyer was named to Canada's 2018 Commonwealth Games team. Thormeyer won a bronze medal in the 100 metre backstroke event. Competing backstroke for the first time on the international senior stage, he qualified for the final in second place with a significant best time. In the final however, he was edged out of silver by tenths of a second, taking the bronze.

The onset of the COVID-19 pandemic resulted in the 2020 Summer Olympics being delayed by a year, as well as causing significant disruptions in Thormeyer's training.  He was out of the pool for four months in the spring and early summer of 2020. Competing in the International Swimming League in the fall provided some relief from these conditions. In June 2021, Thormeyer was named to Canada's Olympic team.

He placed nineteenth in the heats of the 100 m backstroke and did not advance, but made it to the semi-finals of the 200 m backstroke, placing sixteenth in both the heats and the semi-finals. Notably, Thormeyer was part of Canada's team in the 4x100 m freestyle relay, who unexpectedly finished in fourth place despite not having been favoured to make the event final.

Personal bests

Personal life
Thormeyer came out as gay in late 2019.

References

External links
 
 
 
 

1997 births
Living people
Sportspeople from Newmarket, Ontario
Canadian male backstroke swimmers
Medalists at the FINA World Swimming Championships (25 m)
Pan American Games silver medalists for Canada
Olympic swimmers of Canada
Swimmers at the 2016 Summer Olympics
Pan American Games medalists in swimming
World Aquatics Championships medalists in swimming
Swimmers at the 2018 Commonwealth Games
Commonwealth Games medallists in swimming
Commonwealth Games bronze medallists for Canada
UBC Thunderbirds swimmers
People from Delta, British Columbia
Sportspeople from British Columbia
Swimmers at the 2015 Pan American Games
Gay sportsmen
Canadian LGBT sportspeople
LGBT swimmers
Medalists at the 2015 Pan American Games
Swimmers at the 2020 Summer Olympics
Canadian male freestyle swimmers
Medallists at the 2018 Commonwealth Games
Canadian gay men